Brachypodium retusum, the Mediterranean false brome, is a species of perennial grass in the family Poaceae (true grasses). They have a self-supporting growth form and simple, broad leaves and dry fruit. Individuals can grow to 0.8m tall.

Sources

References 

retusum
Flora of Malta